Wolfe Creek Crater is a well-preserved meteorite impact crater (astrobleme) in Western Australia.

Description 
The crater is central to the Wolfe Creek Meteorite Crater National Park.

For many years it was thought to have been created around 300,000 years ago, but in 2019, following investigations by researchers from Portsmouth University together with Australian and US researchers, it is now estimated to be less than 120,000 years old, placing the event in the Pleistocene.

It was brought to the attention of scientists after being spotted during an aerial survey in 1947, investigated on the ground two months later, and reported in publication in 1949. The European name for the crater comes from a nearby creek, which was in turn named after Robert Wolfe (early reports misspell the name as Wolf Creek), a prospector and storekeeper during the gold rush that established the town of Halls Creek.

Aboriginal significance 
The local Djaru (Jaru) Aboriginal people refer to the crater as Kandimalal. There are multiple Dreaming stories about the formation of the crater.  One such story describes the crater's round shape being formed by the passage of a rainbow snake out of the earth, while another snake formed the nearby Sturt Creek.  Another story, as told by an Elder, is that one day the crescent moon and the evening star passed very close to each other. The evening star became so hot that it fell to the ground, causing an enormous explosion and flash, followed by a dust cloud.  This frightened the people and a long time passed before they ventured near the crater to see what had happened. When they finally went there, they realised that this was the site where the evening star had fallen to the Earth. The Djaru people named the place "Kandimalal" and it is prominent in art from the region.

Cultural references 
The crater was featured in the 2005 Australian horror film Wolf Creek, and the sequel in 2013, Wolf Creek 2. It also features in the Stan Australia streaming service original television series with the same name.

It was the setting for Arthur Upfield's 1962 novel The Will of the Tribe.

The Wolfe Creek crater has considerable claim to be the second most 'obvious' (i.e. relatively undeformed by erosion) meteorite crater known on Earth, after the famous Barringer Crater in Arizona.

The crater is mentioned in the 2010 children's science fiction book Alienology that says (in its universe) that a space craft crashed there.

References

Further reading 

 Beasley, A. W., Wolf Creek [sic], Australia's largest meteorite crater. Victorian Naturalist, v. 87, pp. 189–191. 1970
 Cassidy, W. A., Descriptions and topographic maps of the Wolf Creek [sic] and Boxhole craters, Australia (abstract). French, B.M. and Short, N.M., eds., Shock Metamorphism of Natural Materials, Mono Book Corp., Baltimore, MD, p. 623. 1968
 Cassidy, W. A., The Wolf Creek [sic], Western Australia, meteorite crater. Meteoritics, v. 1, pp. 197–199. 1954
 Fudali, R. F., Gravity investigation of Wolf Creek crater [sic], Western Australia. Journal of Geology, v. 87, pp. 55–67. 1979
 Guppy, D. J., Matheson, R. S., Wolf Creek meteorite crater [sic], Western Australia. Bureau of Mineral Resources, Geology and Geophysics, Commonwealth of Australia, pp. 30–36. 1949
 Guppy, D. J., Matheson, R. S., Wolf Creek meteorite crater [sic], Western Australia. The Journal of Geology, v. 58, pp. 30–36. 1950
 Hawke, P. J., Geophysical investigation of the Wolfe Creek meteorite crater, Geological Survey of Western Australia Record 2003/10. 2003
 Knox, R., Jr., Surviving metal in meteoritic iron oxide from the Wolf Creek, Western Australia, meteorite crater. Meteoritics, v. 3, pp. 235–238. 1967
 LaPaz, L., Meteoritic material from the Wolf Creek, Western Australia, crater (abstract). Meteoritics, v. 1, pp. 200–203. 1954
 Leonard, F. C., Further evidence concerning the Wolf Creek, Western Australia, crater (-1278, 192). Popular Astronomy, v. 57, pp. 405–406. 1949
 Leonard, F. C., Is the crater of Wolf Creek, Western Australia (-1278,193) meteoritic? Popular Astronomy, v. 57, pp. 138–140. 1949
 Leonard, F. C., More about the Wolf Creek, Western Australia, crater. Popular Astronomy, v. 57, pp. 345–346. 1949
 McCall, G. J. H., Possible meteorite craters - Wolf Creek, Australia and analogs. New York Academy of Sciences Annals, v. 123, pp. 970–998. 1965
 Miura, Y., New shocked quartz with high density from Wolf Creek impact crater (abstract), Meteoritics, v. 30, p. 551. 1995
 O'Neill, C., Heine, C., Glikson, A. Y., Haines, P. W., Reconstructing the Wolfe Creek meteorite impact; deep structure of the crater and effects on target rock. Australian Journal of Earth Sciences, vol 52, pp. 699–709. 2005
 Taylor, S. R., The Wolf Creek iron meteorite. Nature, v. 208, pp. 944–945. 1965
 Wooler, M. J., Johnson, B. J., Wilkie, A. and Fogel, M. L., Stable isotope characteristics across narrow savanna/woodland ecotones in Wolfe Creek Meteorite Crater, Western Australia. Oecologia, Vol. 145, P. 100- 112. 2005

Impact craters of Western Australia
Pleistocene impact craters
Pleistocene Australia
Great Sandy Desert
Tourist attractions in Western Australia